The 2016–17 Egyptian Super Cup was the 14th edition of the Egyptian Super Cup, an annual football match between the winners of the previous season's Egyptian Premier League and Egypt Cup. The match is usually contested by the winners of the Premier League and the Egypt Cup, Al Ahly won the 2015–16 Egyptian Premier League, Zamalek won the 2016 Egypt Cup. The match was played for 2nd time on international soil at the Mohammed Bin Zayed Stadium in Abu Dhabi, United Arab Emirates.

Zamalek won the trophy after beating Al Ahly 3–1 in the penalty shoot-out, with the game ending 0–0.

Match details

References 

Egyptian Super Cup
2016–17 in Egyptian football
ESC
ESC
Egyptian Super Cup 2016